Nong Phan Tha is a tambon (subdistrict) of So Phisai District, in Bueng Kan Province, Thailand. In 2020 it had a total population of 8,988 people.

History
The subdistrict was created effective March 1, 1967 by splitting off 13 administrative villages from So.

Administration

Central administration
The tambon is subdivided into 12 administrative villages (muban).

Local administration
The whole area of the subdistrict is covered by the subdistrict administrative organization (SAO) Nong Phan Tha (องค์การบริหารส่วนตำบลหนองพันทา).

References

External links
Thaitambon.com on Nong Phan Tha

Tambon of Bueng Kan province
Populated places in Bueng Kan province
So Phisai District